Adriano or Adrião is the form of the Latin given name Hadrianus commonly used in the Italian language; the form Adrian is used in the English language. Notable people with the name include:

 Adriano Banchieri, Italian composer, music theorist, organist and poet
 Adriano Bernareggi, Italian Catholic bishop
 Adriano Castellesi, Italian cardinal and writer
 Adriano Celentano, Italian entertainer
 Adriano Correia de Oliveira, Portuguese singer and composer
 Adriano Espaillat, Dominican-American politician
 Adriano Galliani, Italian entrepreneur
 Adriano Garrido, Brazilian beach volleyball player
 Adriano Olivetti, Italian entrepreneur
 Adriano Panatta, Italian tennis player
 Adriano Rigoglioso, English footballer
 Adriano Sofri, Italian politician and journalist
 Adriano Visconti, Italian air force major
 Adrian Willaert, Flemish composer, who in sources was sometimes referred to simply as "Adriano"

Brazilian footballers 

 Adriano (footballer, born 1969), full name Adriano Silva Francisco, goalkeeper
 Adriano (footballer, born 20 September 1974), midfielder
 Adriano (footballer, born 25 September 1974), forward
 Adriano Basso (born 1975), goalkeeper for Bristol City, among others
 Adriano Alves (born 1976), striker
 Adriano Spadoto (born February 1977), FC Thun player in UEFA Cup, Champions League
 Adriano Gabiru (born 11 August 1977), midfielder for Internacional, once capped for Brazil in Confederations Cup 2003
 Adriano Rossato (born 27 August 1977), defender
 Adriano (footballer, born 1978), full name Adriano Rodrigues da Silva also known as Adriano Cabeça, defensive midfielder and coach
 Adriano (footballer, born January 1979), full name Adriano Vieira Louzada, striker
 Adriano (footballer, born June 1979), full name Adriano Ferreira Silvestre, midfielder
 Ferreira Pinto (footballer, born 1979), full name Adriano Ferreira Pinto, winger for Atalanta
 Adriano Duarte (born 1980), central defender
Adriano (footballer, born January 1982), full name Adriano Ferreira Martins, striker
 Adriano (footballer, born February 1982), full name Adriano Leite Ribeiro, former Inter Milan and Flamengo player, Brazil international in 2000s
 Adriano (footballer, born April 1982), full name Adriano Pereira da Silva, Monaco defender
 Adriano Pimenta (born November 1982), midfielder for Swiss club Thun
 Adriano (footballer, born 1984), full name Adriano Correia Claro, defender/midfielder for Beşiktaş (formerly at Barcelona), Brazil international in 2000s
 Adriano (footballer, born July 1985), full name Adriano Alves dos Santos, defender
 Adriano (footballer, born October 1985), full name Francisco Adriano da Silva Rodrigues, forward
 Luiz Adriano (born April 1987), striker
 Adriano (footballer, born May 1987), full name Adriano Bispo dos Santos, defensive midfielder
 Adriano (footballer, born September 1987), full name Carlos Adriano de Sousa Cruz, strike
 Adriano (footballer, born December 1987), full name Adriano José de Lara
 Adriano (footballer, born February 1994), full name Adriano Louzada e Silva, winger
 Adriano (footballer, born August 1994), Adriano Aparecido Narcizo, winger

See also 
 
 Adrien 
 Hadrian

References 

Italian masculine given names
Portuguese masculine given names
Spanish masculine given names